The Dycer Baronetcy, of Uphall in the County of Hertford, was a title in the Baronetage of England.  It was created on 18 March 1661 for Robert Dycer.  The title became extinct on the early death of the third Baronet in 1676.

Dycer baronets, of Uphall (1661)
Sir Robert Dycer, 1st Baronet ( – 1667)
Sir Robert Dycer, 2nd Baronet (c. 1644 – c. 1675)
Sir Robert Dycer, 3rd Baronet (1667–1676)

References

Extinct baronetcies in the Baronetage of England
1661 establishments in England